The Vélodrome de Queen's Park was a velodrome in Verdun, Montreal, Canada. It hosted the 1899 ICA Track Cycling World Championships between 9 and 11 August.

See also

 List of cycling tracks and velodromes

References

External links

Buildings and structures completed in 1898
Event venues established in 1898
Sports venues completed in 1898
Defunct sports venues in Canada
Sports venues in Montreal
Velodromes in Quebec
1898 establishments in Quebec
Verdun, Quebec